Killing with a Smile is the debut studio album by Australian metalcore band Parkway Drive. It was released on 12 September 2005 through Resist and Epitaph Records, and was produced by Adam Dutkiewicz. It was recorded in May 2005, over a period of just two weeks. It is the only album to feature bassist Shaun Cash.

Release and promotion
It released in September 2005 in Australia through Resist Records. They supported Evergreen Terrace on their headlining Australian tour in January 2006. The album was released in September 2006 in the U.S. through Epitaph Records. A video was produced for "Smoke 'Em If Ya Got 'Em".

In October and November, the group went on the 2006 international edition of the Taste of Chaos tour, visiting New Zealand, Australia, Japan and Europe. From early July to early August, the band went on the 2007 edition of Warped Tour.

Critical reception 

Since its release, Killing with a Smile has received mixed to positive reviews.

AbsolutePunk was very positive of the album, calling it a "true genre-defining" record. The reviewer praised the songs' structures, despite there being no defined verses or choruses. About.com reviewer Chad Bower was less positive about the album, but said "It's a very solid debut, and if you're a metalcore fan this is one worth checking out." He was slightly critical of the album's lyrics for being "a little on the emo side", but said the "angry vocals" cover it up pretty well.

AllMusic reviewer Corey Apar gave a mixed review of the album. He mainly noted how the album's lyrics deal with broken hearts and "just how pissed off they really are", citing "Romance is Dead" as "lyrical treasure". He concluded his review by comparing the band to Bleeding Through and "it just depends on where personal opinions currently stand on the necessity of another metalcore act".

Punknews.org reviewer Matt Whelihan was very critical of the album, calling it generic. Whelihan said the album "is a mindless affair that is unable to avoid any of metalcore's pitfalls. Parkway Drive could have created a picture of metalcore as they see it, but instead they were content to trace the works of those who came before."

In popular culture 
The name for the song "Guns for Show, Knives for a Pro" is a quote from the film, Lock, Stock and Two Smoking Barrels.

Australian surf group the Bra Boys featured four songs from the album in the documentary film Bra Boys: Blood Is Thicker than Water, the songs featured are "Gimme A D", "Anasasis (Xenophontis)", "Mutiny" and "It's Hard to Speak Without a Tongue". The songs were all released on the soundtrack except for "It's Hard to Speak Without a Tongue".

Track listing

Personnel 
Credits are adapted from the album liner notes.

Parkway Drive
 Winston McCall – lead vocals
 Jeff Ling – lead guitar
 Luke "Pig" Kilpatrick – rhythm guitar
 Shaun "Cashy" Cash – bass
 Ben "Gaz" Gordon – drums

Additional personnel
 Adam Dutkiewicz – production, engineering, mixing
 Waynus Krupa – assistant engineering
 Steve Smart and Tom Baker – mastering
 Graham Nixon – management
 Asterik Studio – art direction, design
 Jerad Knudsen – photography

Chart performance

Certifications

Release history

References

External links 
 
 Killing with a Smile at Epitaph Records
 Interview with Winston McCall including song explanations

2005 debut albums
Albums produced by Adam Dutkiewicz
Epitaph Records albums
Parkway Drive albums
Resist Records albums